Walter Brookmann (April 23, 1901 – August 31, 1957) was a German politician of the Christian Democratic Union (CDU) and former member of the German Bundestag.

Life 
Brookmann joined the CDU in 1946 and was CDU Secretary General in Schleswig-Holstein from August 1946 to October 1949. Brookmann was a member of the German Bundestag from 1949 until his death in 1957. There he was deputy chairman of the Committee for All-German Affairs from 1949 to 1953 and deputy chairman of the Committee for All-German and Berlin Affairs from 1953 until his death. Brookmann always entered the Bundestag as a directly elected member of the Kiel constituency.

Literature

References

1901 births
1957 deaths
Members of the Bundestag for Schleswig-Holstein
Members of the Bundestag 1953–1957
Members of the Bundestag 1949–1953
Members of the Bundestag for the Christian Democratic Union of Germany